Piute County School District is a school district located in Piute County in southern Utah, United States. It serves all the communities within Piute County and is the third smallest of the 41 school districts within the state in terms of student enrollment.

Communities served
The Piute County School District serves the following communities:

 Circleville
 Greenwich
 Junction
 Kingston
 Marysvale

Schools
The following are schools within the Piute County School District:

Elementary schools

 Circleville Elementary School - Circleville
 Oscarson Elementary School - Marysvale

High schools

 Piute High School - Junction

Special schools

 Storm Ridge Ranch - Marysvale

See also

 List of school districts in Utah

References

External links

 

School districts in Utah
Education in Piute County, Utah